Jorge Cáceres (14 April 1917 – 3 December 1975) was an Argentine modern pentathlete and Argentine army general. His brother, was the Minister of Defense under the presidencies of Roberto Marcelo Levingston and Alejandro Agustín Lanusse.

Early life
Cáceres was born in 1917 in Paraná, Entre Ríos, Argentina.  He entered Colegio Militar de la Nación in 1925, and graduated as a second lieutenant.  He competed in the modern pentathlon event at the 1952 Summer Olympics, and placed 34th individually and 8th as a team.

Military career
From 1970–1971, Cáceres served as the chief of the Argentine Federal Police.  He retired from the military in September 1972, and was honored by Chile and Paraguay.

Assassination
Cáceres was assassinated along with his wife by the left-wing guerilla group Monteneros on 3 December 1975 in Paraná, a few months before the beginning of the military dictatorship of Jorge Rafael Videla.  The couple was survived by a son.

References

External links
 

1917 births
1975 deaths
Argentine male modern pentathletes
Olympic modern pentathletes of Argentina
Modern pentathletes at the 1952 Summer Olympics
People from Paraná, Entre Ríos
Deaths by firearm in Argentina
People murdered in Argentina
Terrorism deaths in Argentina
Colegio Militar de la Nación alumni
Sportspeople from Entre Ríos Province
20th-century Argentine people